Emil Martinsen Lilleberg (born 2 February 2001) is a Norwegian ice hockey player for IK Oskarshamn and the Norwegian national team.

He was drafted 107th overall in the 2021 NHL Entry Draft by the Arizona Coyotes.

He represented Norway at the 2021 IIHF World Championship.

References

External links

2001 births
Living people
Arizona Coyotes draft picks
IK Oskarshamn players
Norwegian ice hockey defencemen
People from Sarpsborg
Sparta Warriors players
Sportspeople from Viken (county)